Perina is a genus of tussock moths in the family Erebidae. It was described by Francis Walker in 1855 and is found in China, Sri Lanka and throughout India.

Description
In the male, the palpi are extremely minute. Antennae with long branches. Mid and hind tibia with minute terminal spur pairs. Forewings with extremely oblique outer margin. Vein 3 from before angle of cell. Vein 4 and 5 on a short stalk. Vein 6 from upper angle. Veins 9 to 10 are stalked, where veins 7 and 10 being off towards apex. Hindwings with veins 3 from before angle of cell. Veins 4 and 5 stalked and vein 6 absent.

In the female, the antennae have shorter branches. Forewings with the outer margin not so oblique. Hindwings with veins 4 and 5 from angle of cell. Vein 6 present and stalked with vein 7.

Species
The following species are included in the genus.
Perina kalisi Collenette, 1949
Perina lodra Moore, 1859
Perina nuda Fabricius, 1787
Perina psamma Collenette, 1933
Perina pura Walker, 1869
Perina sunda Holloway, 1999

References

Lymantriinae
Moth genera